Paraphasis is a monotypic moth genus of the family Tortricidae described by Lord Walsingham in 1907. Its only species, Paraphasis perkinsi, described by the same author in the same year, is endemic to the Hawaiian island of Kauai.

See also
List of Tortricidae genera

References

External links
Tortricidae.com

Archipini
Endemic moths of Hawaii
Monotypic moth genera
Moths described in 1907
Taxa named by Thomas de Grey, 6th Baron Walsingham
Tortricidae genera